The 2021 season is Pokhara Thunders's 1st Nepal Super League season.

Season overview

On 19 March, Pokhara Thunders announced the signing of Nepal national football team striker Nawayug Shrestha as its marquee player.

On the auction of Nepal Super League, Pokhara Thunders acquired various players such as Nepal national football team captain Sujal Shrestha, Goalkeeper Arpan Karki, Nitin Thapa, etc.

Pokhara Thunders announced the signing of three overseas player, Ketcha Yannick, Bidias Rim Raphael and Moussa Abagana. All of these players are Cameroonian citizen.

Competition

Nepal Super League

Results

League table

Statistics

Goalscorers

References

External links
Nepal Super League 2021

Lalitpur City FC
Nepalese football clubs 2021 season